The 1968 IIHF European U19 Championship was the first official edition of the IIHF European Junior Championships. Tampere in Finland hosted the six team tournament from 26 December 1967 to 3 January 1968. Finland were qualified as hosts; the other five participants were qualified through the playoffs, played in November and December 1967.

Qualification 

East Germany qualified for the main tournament.

Sweden qualified for the main tournament.

Poland qualified for the main tournament.

Soviet Union qualified for the main tournament.

West Germany withdrew. Czechoslovakia qualified for the main tournament.

Tournament 

East Germany was relegated to Group B for 1969.

Tournament Awards
Top Scorer:  Walenty Ziętara  (scored 11 goals)
Top Goalie:  Jiří Crha
Top Defenceman: Valeri Vasiliev
Top Forward:  Walenty Ziętara

References

 

Junior
IIHF European U19 Championship
IIHF European U19 Championship
IIHF European Junior Championship tournament
International ice hockey competitions hosted by Finland
IIHF European U19 Championship
IIHF European U19 Championship
Sports competitions in Tampere